Here I Am, Here I Stay is a 1959 West German musical comedy film directed by Werner Jacobs and produced by Artur Brauner. It stars Caterina Valente, Hans Holt and Ruth Stephan. The film also features a guest appearance by Bill Haley.

Plot
The singer Caterine, owner of a bar/night club in Paris, wants to marry her boyfriend Pierre. However, at the registrar's office she finds out that she is allegedly already married to one Baron Hubert von Löwenherz, owner of a castle. A former employee had stolen Caterine's documents and married the Baron under her assumed identity — before disappearing with the family jewels. Caterine travels to the Baron's castle, where a visit by his rich uncle forces the Baron to stage a life of married harmony with Caterine as his wife. Eventually, Caterine and the Baron fall for each other, whilst Pierre finds a new romance with the castle's cook.

Cast
 Caterina Valente as Caterine
 Hans Holt as Baron Hubert von Löwenherz
 Ruth Stephan as Lucie
 Boy Gobert as Gustave
 Margarete Haagen as Baronin Appollonia von Löwenherz
 Paul Henckels as Baron Eduard von Löwenherz
 Ann Smyrner as Karin
  as Pierre
 Wolfgang Neuss as Presenter
 Bill Haley & His Comets as Themselves

Production
Hier bin ich - hier bleib ich was directed by Werner Jacobs and produced by Artur Brauner. The screenplay was written by Curth Flatow and Eckart Hachfeld, based on the play  by Raymond Vincy and Jean Valmy. An earlier French film of 1954 is also based on this play.

Filming took place from 16 October to 11 November 1958 in Bamberg and Schloss Seehof in Franconia, as well as at the Spandau Studios in Berlin. The line producer of the film was Horst Wendlandt. The film's sets were designed by the art directors Walter Kutz and Helmut Nentwig,

The film premiered at the Gloria-Palast in Stuttgart on 8 January 1959.

Soundtrack
In the late 1980s Bear Family Records of Germany released a soundtrack album for the film, which was notable for including two of the three Bill Haley recordings which had been made exclusively for the movie (including "Vive la Rock and Roll" which featured the then-unprecedented duet between Haley and Caterina Valente, and "Hot Dog Buddy Buddy"). The third Haley recording made for the film, "Whoa Mabel", has not surfaced as of 2011 (like the other two it is not the same recording as released by Haley on Decca Records).

References

External links
 Artur-Brauner-Archive at the Deutsches Filmmuseum in Frankfurt (German), containing the production files for this movie
 

1959 films
1959 musical comedy films
German musical comedy films
West German films
1950s German-language films
Films directed by Werner Jacobs
German films based on plays
Remakes of French films
Constantin Film films
Films shot at Spandau Studios
1950s German films